Gohir is a small village in Nakodar. Nakodar is a tehsil in the city Jalandhar of Indian state of Punjab.

About 
Gohir lies on the Nakodar-Jalandhar road. It is almost 4 km from Nakodar bus stand. The nearest main road to Gohir is Nakodar-Jalandhar road. The nearest Railway station to this village is Nakodar Railway station.

STD code 
Gohir's STD code is 01821.

References

Villages in Jalandhar district
Villages in Nakodar tehsil